The Peacocks may refer to:

Music 
 The Peacocks (album), a 1975 album by Stan Getz and Jimmie Rowles
 The Peacocks (Backup band), an American backup band with Jack White
 The Peacocks, a minor punk band from Switzerland

Other uses 
 The Peacocks (Woking), a shopping centre near London, England (now Victoria Place)
 Leeds United F.C., an association football club from Yorkshire, England

See also
 Peacocks (disambiguation)
 Peafowl, the eponymic bird
 The Peahen, a pub in St. Albans, South East England